The Triune Kingdom or Triune Kingdom of Croatia, Slavonia and Dalmatia was the concept—advocated by the leaders of the 19th-century Croatian national revival—of a united kingdom between Croatia, Slavonia and Dalmatia, which were already within the Austrian Empire under one king, who was also the Emperor of Austria, but were politically and administratively separate entities. This concept had roots in the high medieval period, as a successor to the historical Kingdom of Croatia which was made up of those regions.

After 1867, Croatia and Slavonia were within the Hungarian half of Austria-Hungary and were united in 1868 as the Kingdom of Croatia-Slavonia, where the name Triune Kingdom of Croatia, Slavonia and Dalmatia became official. However, Dalmatia, being located in the Austrian half, still remained de facto separate. Until the end of the Austro-Hungarian Empire, several Croatian political parties and groups sought recognition of the Triune Kingdom and the incorporation of Dalmatia into Croatia-Slavonia. The Croatian intelligentsia, especially lawyers and historians, played a key role in interpreting historical sources so as to legitimize the demand for the Triune Kingdom.

History

The unification among the three Kingdoms started gaining popularity in the 14th century and was originally used in the title of the Ban of Croatia, Slavonia and Dalmatia in the medieval Croatian Kingdom. The first usage of the term Triune Kingdom was in 1527 by the Habsburgs, to make the title of the Croatia, Dalmatia and Slavonia seem grander, this can be seen in titles given to Krsto Frankopan, as well as other examples from 1527. The Croatian Sabor was, in 1681, officially named the Congregatio Croatiae, Dalmatiae et Slavoniae Later In the 18th century, Maria Theresa founded the Royal Council for the Kingdom of Croatia, Dalmatia and Slavonia. However, only in the early 19th century, in parallel with the demands for the unification of the three Croatian Kingdoms and modern nation building, did the use of the name "Triune Kingdom" intensify.

Prior to 1848, the Croatians had claimed territories which had been contested by both the Hungarians and the Vienna Court War Council within the Austrian Empire, and also by the Ottoman Empire. During the Revolutions of 1848, Croatian nationalists in the Sabor proposed the unification of the Triune Kingdom, which would be an autonomous Croatian cultural and political union within the Habsburg Empire. Political representatives of Croatia advocated the notion to the Emperor, and demanded the unification of the three Croatian kingdoms. During the revolutions, Dalmatia was temporarily under the control of Ban Josip Jelačić of Croatia. However, the Italian-speaking elite dominating the Diet of Dalmatia urged autonomy for the Kingdom as an Austrian crown land against the Croatian national revival movement's demand for a Triune Kingdom.

Following the Austro-Hungarian Compromise of 1867 and the Croatian–Hungarian Settlement of 1868, the Hungarian claims on Slavonia and the Austrian claims on the Military Frontier were formally relinquished. Croatia and Slavonia were unified into the autonomous Kingdom of Croatia-Slavonia. However, a unification with Dalmatia was denied and while Croatia-Slavonia was incorporated into the Lands of the Crown of Saint Stephen (Hungarian half), Dalmatia remained a crown land of the Cislethanian (Austrian) half of the Dual Monarchy. Croatia-Slavonia nevertheless formally called itself the "Triune Kingdom of Croatia, Slavonia and Dalmatia", pressing its claims on Dalmatia.

Sections of the Croatian–Hungarian Settlement of 1868 became contentious issues, as the Croatian version defined the territory of the "Lands of the Crown of Saint Stephen" as "a state union of the Kingdom of Hungary and the Kingdoms of Dalmatia, Croatia and Slavonia". The Hungarian version of the same settlement meanwhile, referred to it as Croatia, Slavonia and Dalmatia, withholding the word "Kingdom" and changing the order of the countries names. Documents issued by Austria put the order as "Dalmatia, Croatia and Slavonia", after instructions from Friedrich Ferdinand von Beust to distinguish Dalmatia from Croatia and Slavonia in order to emphasize its membership of the Austrian half of the Empire.

During the Croatian National Revival and the second half of the 19th century, Croatian intelligentsia, especially lawyers and historians, in the struggle for a united Triune Kingdom, were involved in interpreting historical sources seeking to legitimize and politically argue the full meaning of the name of the Triune Kingdom. By the end of the 19th century, recognition of the Triune Kingdom was the primary goal of the Independent People's Party, as well as the People's Party of Dalmatia.

In 1874, Ivan Kukuljević Sakcinski published various findings from archival collections—in his work Codex Diplomaticus,<ref>Kukuljevic-Sakcinski, Ivan von [Hrsg.]. – Zagreb (1874), Codex diplomaticus regni Croatiae, Dalmatiae et Slavoniae </ref> now kept in the Croatian State Archives—documents from all periods that speak of the Kingdom of Croatia, Dalmatia and Slavonia, consisting of:
 Privileges – Privilegia Regnorum Croatiae, Dalmatiae et Slavoniae, dated 1377
 Protocols – Protocolla Congregationis generalis Regnorum Croatiae, Dalmatiae et Slavoniae, dated 1557
 Minutes   – Acta Congregationum Regni, dated 1562
 Minutes   – Transumpta documentorum iura Croatica tangentium'', dated 1249

See also
 Trialism in Austria-Hungary

References

Sources
 
 
 
 
 

Political terminology of Croatia
19th century in Croatia
20th century in Croatia
Politics of Austria-Hungary